The Belfast Northstars is one of two clubs from Northern Ireland competing in the Baseball Ireland adult league. An amateur club, the Northstars play their home games at Hydebank Playing Fields in Newtownbreda, Belfast. The club competes in Baseball Ireland's B League.

Franchise history

The early years
The Northstars were formed in September 1996 when 10 players split away from the Belfast Blue Sox. The Blue Sox had been affiliated with baseball in Britain, but travelling to games and hosting visiting teams became problematic.

Following the Blue Sox' demise, Gerry Long of Los Angeles was installed as the Northstars' first coach, and the new team quickly established an affiliation with Baseball Ireland.

2004: A winning season and playoff contenders
Following a frustrating first few years of existence, in which the team often performing poorly in the standings, the 2004 season saw the Northstars in contention to the last day of the season.  The club beat one of the league's new teams, the Dublin Trojans, as well as the established Dublin Black Sox.  Following two narrow defeats against the reigning champion Dublin Hurricanes, the Northstars came close to making the playoffs but lost the final game of the season to the Black Sox, with that team finishing with a 12–6 record to the Northstars' 11–7 and barely edging out the Black Sox for one of the four playoff spots.

The 2005 League Trophy final
A shake-up in Baseball Ireland's league structure for the 2005 season saw the creation of two separate competitions. Teams in the now nine-team league played each other just once before the league split into two. The top five teams competed for the League Championship while the remaining four battled for the newly created League Trophy. Teams played each other twice in the second half.
By winning three of their first four games in the second half, the Northstars faced the now defunct Dublin Panthers, who had won their first four games, in two games that would decide the trophy winners.
The Panthers, however, swept the short series at the O'Malley Fields at Corkagh Park in Clondalkin, West Dublin, the home of Irish Baseball.

2010: A winning season and playoffs
The addition of new young players alongside many established veterans helped the club to its first winning season in five years.
Highlights included two victories over the reigning national champions the Spartans in Belfast, while there were also wins against the Black Sox, Hurricanes and league newcomers the Munster Warriors.
By finishing the regular season with a record of 8 wins and 7 defeats, the Northstars placed fourth in the table, setting up a playoff semi-final with the Spartans.

2013–2014

The Northstars entered a growth and development phase in 2013, bringing in former Keuka College Storm pitcher Jonathan Sculli as co-manager, finishing a respectable eighth place at the Finkstonball tournament in Attnang-Puchheim, Austria and reintroducing the development team to Baseball Ireland's B League.

By the first weekend in August, both A and B teams had qualified for the playoffs.
The strong 2013 season was followed by another trip to the playoffs in the 2014 season, a berth clinched following a home two-game sweep over the defending champion Spartans.

Players

Retired numbers

At the end of the 2004 season, the Northstars retired the number 12, which had been worn for eight seasons by their first full international player, Terry Rosbotham.

Rosbotham, the Northstars starting shortstop and one-time outfielder with the Ireland National team, had his career cut short due to a serious knee injury.

Prior to taking up baseball, Rosbotham played American football in Belfast.

An accomplished fielder and clutch hitter, his meteoric rise in baseball saw him selected in 2001 to represent Ireland at Fenway Park in Boston against the Slocum baseball club from Rhode Island.

His number was retired during a post-season awards ceremony in Belfast in 2004.
Rosbotham continues to train with the Northstars and in 2007 became a player coach of the Belfast Brawlers softball team. He currently coaches and plays softball for the Smokin Aces in the Ulster Softball League.

International players 

To date, Terry Rosbotham remains the only Northstar to have played in a full international for Ireland, playing outfield in 2001 at Fenway Park.

Two years later, both he and teammate John Want were named as members of the Irish Development Baseball Team.

In 2006, two young Northstar outfielders – David McCullagh and Conor Keenan – were both selected to represent Ireland ahead of the European B Pool Championships in Belgium, but neither made an appearance.

In 2010, Colin Powers was selected to travel to Rhode Island with the National Team as a Development Player.

There has been Northstars representation on both the President's 9 and Los Barbaros, select international teams made up of non-Irish nationals playing in the Baseball Ireland adult league.

Pitchers Gordon Cuthbert and Conor Dawson are among those to have appeared for the President's 9.

Team MVPs 

At the culmination of each season, Northstars players cast votes for their season MVP.  Awards are also handed out for Team Player and Most Improved Player of the year.

2006 Gordon Cuthbert was named MVP by his team after a successful season on the mound and at the plate. A right-handed pitcher, he was one of the original Northstars that broke away from the Blue Sox in 1996. He was rewarded for his "solid and consistent pitching" and "good offensive numbers". He was also named MVP in 1998.

2005 One year after being named most improved player, Northstars first baseman and pitcher Sean Shackley was presented with the MVP award recording a batting average of .360 and slugging percantage of .560.

2004 Player coach Stephen Van Houten was the overwhelming choice for team MVP in 2004. He led the Baseball Ireland adult league in stolen bases with 18 swipes in 18 games, had a batting average of .400, an OBP of .531, scored 25 runs and drove in 18.

2003 Joe Mladnich from Florida was named 2003 MVP after a successful all-round year. In a losing season, Mladnich was the only Northstars pitcher to finish the year with a winning record, ending with two wins and one loss and with an ERA of 5.48. At the plate, Mladnich batted .286, had an OBP of .353, scored nine runs, drove in five and stole five bases.

2002 Catcher John Want was the choice for MVP after a terrific year with the bat. He ended the season with a .394 average, .512 OBP and had a slugging percentage of .576. He scored 11 runs and drove in 10 and hit four doubles and one triple. Behind the plate, Want had a fielding percentage of .897.

Honours

A League
 Playoffs: (3)– 2010, 2013, 2014

B League
 Winners: (1)– 2016
 Runners-up: (1)– 2013
 Playoffs: (2)– 2013, 2014

League Trophy
 Runners-up: (1)– 2005

Uniform colour and design

The Northstars colours are maroon and gold. In home games the team wears maroon shirts with the team name, stylised as NorthStars, written in gold lettering. Player numbers – also in gold – appear only on the back of the shirt.

Belfast has the only team in the Baseball Ireland league with such a colour scheme.

When the team plays on the road it changes to gold shirts with 'Belfast' written on the front in maroon lettering. Grey road shirts were worn for the opening game of the 2007 season against Twins United in Dublin.

In their first few years of league play, the team wore red shirts with grey lettering but changed to the new colours of maroon and gold ahead of the 2003 season, when Stephen Van Houten was appointed player-coach.

Playing in a city in which colours such as blue and green have become affiliated with one religion or another, the club wanted neutral colours for its own uniform.

On one occasion during the 2006 season the Northstars changed from its traditional maroon and gold and instead played in black shirts.

Honouring Irish McIlveen 

On 1 July 2006, the Northstars team wore black shirts and Pittsburgh Pirates caps to mark the 100th anniversary of Irish McIlveen's major league debut.

Highly acclaimed and praised as a phenomenon during baseball's 'deadball era', McIlveen remains Belfast's only link to the major leagues.

He made his debut, pitching for the Pirates on 4 July 1906.

The 2006 game against the Dublin Spartans was won fittingly by Spartans left-handed pitcher Chaime Cuevas.

In an interview with the Irish News after the game, John Dillon, Ireland international and Spartans club captain, said it was a privilege to be involved in the celebrations.

"While the baseball league in Ireland is still in its infancy, it is satisfying to know that so many Irish emigrants have gone before us and played in the major leagues in the US. 

"Perhaps one day, we'll be seeing another Irish player emigrating to the US to play in the majors."

In addition, Northstars infielder Simon Doyle wears uniform number 53, the number of major league games played by McIlveen in his short career.

The Belfast Wolves

A second Belfast team was added to Baseball Ireland ahead of the 2004 season. The Belfast Wolves took their name from the city's Harland and Wolff shipyard. The team was the brainchild of then Northstars player-coach Stephen Van Houten and was an attempt to lay the groundwork towards the creation of a northern division of Baseball Ireland.

The Wolves team struggled for two years in the adult league, winning just a handful of games, before being relegated to the status of Northstars' farm team for the 2006 season. At the end of their third season, the Wolves were dissolved, with the players joining the Northstars roster for the 2007 season.

The Northstars and Wolves had faced each other on five occasions in the 2004 and 2005 seasons, with the Northstars winning every time.

Northstars on film/television

The Emerald Diamond, a documentary film released in 2006 that chronicles the history of baseball in Ireland and the Irish National team, features footage of a 2005 Northstars game against the Blue Devils of Dublin.

On 15 March 2007, Ulster Television broadcast a short documentary entitled Fastball, which told the story of how baseball helped US-born players cope with homesickness. The film featured footage of Northstars games, interviews with players and also delved into the history of baseball in Belfast. 

The team has also been featured on BBC Northern Ireland's Irish language program SRL.

References

External links 
 Northstars official site
 
 The Emerald Diamond
 Causeway Coast Little League 
Belfast baseball looking for its `field of dreams'

Baseball teams in Ireland
Sports clubs in Belfast
Baseball teams established in 1996
1996 establishments in Northern Ireland